is the 20th entry in the Tsuburaya Productions' long-running Ultra Series. It is a revival of the 1967 series Ultraseven, and is the first in Tsuburaya Productions' Ultra hero series to be exclusively for an adult audience and in a wide screen high-definition format. The show first aired on October 5, 2007 at 2:15am on CBC and 2:25am on TBS.

On May 11, 2017, Toku announced that the series would air in the United States on its channel with English subtitles beginning June 5 until June 12, 2017. On Friday, September 29 the entire series was made available for viewing on Verizon's go90.

Plot
The series took place in a world where all forms of war and terrorism had long ended, bringing forth a dystopian future. An amnesiac man named Jin awakened and was entrusted with missions given by DEUS to fight against aliens that had slipped into the human society, joining forces with agents K and S. During that moment, he was given a pair of glasses by Elea Saeki to transform into the red giant. While fighting to preserve the safety of the city, Jin becomes closer to discovering his memories.

Near the end of the series, Jin, K, and S discover that their world is silently ruled by an alien race through subjugating mankind into a state of utopia. While on the run from DEUS agents, Jin discovered that he was bonded to Ultraseven, the red giant from another world to stop the aliens from invading his home dimension. When Seven reawakened, he quickly destroyed the entire alien race and saved Jin's comrades from a suicide bombing attack. Jin was separated from Seven as the latter returned to his world as Dan Moroboshi, reuniting with his lover Anne.

Characters

Ultraseven X

DEUS
 is the special investigative team organized in order to defend the Earth against alien invaders. Although they live as normal people, members of DEUS can be called into action at any given time. Agents call each other by code name rather than their actual names. It is revealed to be an A.I. that controls all of the world's information on behalf of the shadow rulers. The known agents of DEUS are:

Jin: See here
K: He is an agent of DEUS and executes missions with Jin. He is 25 years old.
S: She is an agent of DEUS and focuses on undercover missions. She eats chocolate frequently. She is 25 years old.
R: Aiding a flying saucer responsible for kidnapping people who felt that their life was worthless, he eventually wanted to be taken away by it too, but was killed when a beam was fired onto him by it, leaving a burning ground.
D: An agent who fell in love with a female alien who was supposed to gather information preparing for an invasion, he did all he could to protect her. He also taught her to play the guitar, which she fell in love with as she loved the music from it. He pretended to have been killed by a flash of light during a mission with S, in order to disappear to spend time with his lover.

Arsenal
: A multipurpose wristwatch-like communicator which can also function as a GPS, deploying an electromagnetic barrier and anti-gravity to survive a fall from a skyscraper.
: A small laser gun customized for anti-aliens carried by agents. It shares its name with the standard weaponry of Ultra Guard from Ultraseven, but different in terms of model, which illustrated to portray a near-futuristic design.

Aqua Project
The Aqua Project is a top secret project conducted by the government. It is supposed to convert energy in water into atomic energy. When it was found to open a portal into a parallel universe, the project was halted. However, it was restarted by the shadow rulers in an attempt to invade the parallel universe. Members of the project then found out about the shadow rulers, and were all killed, except for one:

Elea Saeki: An employee in the Science Department, she was part of the Aqua Project, a top secret project by the government. After coming close to finding out the real identity of the shadow rulers, she and Jin were pursued by DEUS agents. When they fell into Lake Nousu trying to escape the agents, she was contacted by Ultraseven and gave permission to him to "become one" with Jin. When Jin awoke, she handed the Ultra Eye to him so that he can transform into Ultraseven. She is 22 years old.

List of episodes

Cast
: 
: 
: 
: 
:  (Voice)
: ,

Guest actors
:  (Episode 1)
: MiWa (Episode 1)
:  (Episode 2)
:  (Episode 2)
:  (Episode 3)
:  (Episode 4)
:  (Episode 4)
:  (Episode 5)
:  (Episode 6)
:  (Episode 6)
:  (Voice in Episode 6)
:  (Episode 7)
:  (Episode 7)
:  (Episode 7)
:  (Episode 8)
:  (Episode 8)
: 
:  (Episode 9)
:  (Episode 9)
:  (Episode 9)
:  (Episode 9)
:  (Episode 10)
:  (Episode 10)
:  (Episode 12)
:  (Episode 12)

Post-release

Novelization
A novel series of Ultraseven X was released and published in Hobby Japan.

Home media
In July 2020, Shout! Factory announced to have struck a multi-year deal with Alliance Entertainment and Mill Creek, with the blessings of Tsuburaya and Indigo, that granted them the exclusive SVOD and AVOD digital rights to the Ultra series and films (1,100 TV episodes and 20 films) acquired by Mill Creek the previous year. Ultraseven X, amongst other titles, will stream in the United States and Canada through Shout! Factory TV and Tokushoutsu.

Songs
Main theme
"Another day comes"
Lyrics: K
Composition and Artist: Pay Money to My Pain

References

External links
Official Ultraseven X site  
 

2007 Japanese television series debuts
2007 Japanese television series endings
Ultra Seven
Ultra television series
Cyberpunk television series
Dystopian television series
Horror drama